Valery Hiek is a Cameroon football player.

Career
He started his football in Cercle Sportif de Yaounde, Then in 2008 he signed for Home United.

In 2011 at the Jalan Besar Stadium, Home United FC lifted the RHB Singapore Cup after a hard-fought 1–0 win over Albirex Niigata FC.

Both teams were locked in a tactical battle from the start of the match. Albirex Niigata FC were playing their usual possession game as the Protectors sat back with five defenders. Despite that, Albirex Niigata FC were unable to carve out good openings as Man-of-the-match Valery Heik led his defence superbly.

During his time at home united he won the Singapore Cup in 2011, At the start of the season the protectors signal title ambitions
by bringing in the firepower that the club hopes will be enough to clinch the 2011 S.League title, With the backline of Japanese defender Kenji Arai and Mendy to bolster an already solid line-up that comprises the likes of Valery Hiek, Shi Jiayi and Juma'at Jantan.

In 2012, he signed for Bangkok Glass, after which in 2013 he signed for Chainat Hornbill.

Honours

Club

Home United
 Singapore Cup Champions: 2011

Individual
 S. League Player of the Year 2009

References

Living people
1981 births
Cameroonian footballers
Valery Hiek
Cameroonian expatriate footballers
Expatriate footballers in Singapore
Expatriate footballers in Thailand
Cameroonian expatriate sportspeople in Singapore
Cameroonian expatriate sportspeople in Thailand
Home United FC players
Singapore Premier League players
Valery Hiek
Valery Hiek
Association football defenders